The aulochrome is a woodwind instrument invented by Belgian François Louis and first prototyped in 1999. It consists of two soprano saxophones that can be played either separately or together. The name comes from Greek aulos (name of the most important ancient Greek musical instrument) and chrome (for chromatic and colored). The first user of this instrument was saxophonist Fabrizio Cassol, and Joe Lovano has recently recorded with it as well. Composer Philippe Boesmans wrote a work for aulochrome and orchestra, Fanfare III, which was premiered in 2002 by Cassol and conductor Sylvain Cambreling.

References

External links
 

Belgian jazz
Saxophones